Novosibirsk State Conservatory named after M. I. Glinka is an educational music institution in Novosibirsk, Russia. It was founded in 1956.

Novosibirsk Conservatory is the first and only high school of music in Siberia.

History 
The conservatory was opened in 1956, it occupied the building constructed by Andrey Kryachkov in 1923–1924.

In 1957, the educational institution was named after the composer Mikhail Glinka.

In 1981, the museum opened in the conservatory.

Notable teachers
 Teofils Biķis (1975–1989), pianist
 Zakhar Bron (1974–?), violinist
 Vladimir Urbanovich (1970–1979), opera singer
 Yuri Yukechev (since 1970), composer

Notable students
 Vladimir Galouzine, opera singer
 Galina Gorchakova, opera singer
 Mark Gorenstein, conductor
 Vadim Repin, violinist

Bibliography

External links
 Novosibirsk State Conservatory (Academy) named after M. I. Glinka. Новосибирская государственная консерватория (академия) им. М. И. Глинки. Culture.ru.

Education in Novosibirsk
Zheleznodorozhny City District, Novosibirsk
 
Educational institutions established in 1956
1956 establishments in Russia
Cultural heritage monuments of regional significance in Novosibirsk Oblast
Music schools in Russia